Ottawa/Gatineau Water Aerodrome, formerly , was on the north side of the Ottawa River in Quebec, Canada.

See also
 List of airports in the Ottawa area

References

Transport in Gatineau
Defunct seaplane bases in Quebec